Joseph Yam Chi-kwong, GBM, GBS, CBE, JP (任志剛; born 1948, Hong Kong) is a Hong Kong statistician, economist and civil servant. He was the first Chief Executive of the Hong Kong Monetary Authority, Hong Kong's de facto central bank, holding the position for 16 years. In 2011 Yam was elected to a member of the board of directors of the Swiss Bank UBS AG. In 2014, following UBS AG's restructuring, he was appointed to the board of directors of the UBS Group AG and served in the position till May 2017. He has been a member of the Corporate Culture and Responsibility Committee and the Risk Committee of the UBS Group AG since 2011 and a non-official member of the Executive Council of Hong Kong since 2017.

Education
Joseph Yam graduated from the University of Hong Kong in economics, social sciences and statistics with first class honors in 1970.

Career
Yam joined the Government of Hong Kong as a statistician in 1971 and became an economist in 1976. Subsequently, in 1982, Yam was appointed as Principal Assistant Secretary for Monetary Affairs.

In 1983, Yam contributed to formulating the peg between the Hong Kong dollar and US dollar. In 1985, he was appointed as Deputy Secretary for Monetary Affairs and in 1991, as a Director of the Office of the Exchange Fund. When the Office of the Exchange Fund merged with the Office of the Commissioner of Banking in 1993 to become the Hong Kong Monetary Authority (HKMA), Yam took the position of Chief Executive of the new body.

Tenure as Chief Executive of HKMA
Yam served as Chief Executive of the Hong Kong Monetary Authority for 16 years, from its inauguration on 1 April 1993 until 30 September 2009.

In 1995, the Hong Kong Institute of Bankers voted Yam Banker of the Year.

Despite a study conducted by S. K. Tsang, a Professor of Economics in Hong Kong Baptist University, entitled "A Study of the Linked Exchange Rate System and Policy Options for Hong Kong" and indicating there were weaknesses of the HKD-USD exchange rate peg system during the 1997 Asian Financial Crisis, Yam did not amend the narrow-based peg, but defended the Hong Kong dollar by pushing up interest rates. In particular, Yam pushed the overnight Interbank rates up to 280% on 23 October 1997.

In an audacious move, the HKMA also bought US$15 billion in stocks amidst the market panic in 1998. The measure restored calm, and consequently succeeded to defend the Hong Kong fixed exchange rate parity against the US dollar. The move was initially criticised by, amongst others, Alan Greenspan, who voiced concern in September 1998 that the strategy would fail and erode the credibility of the HKMA. "It turned out that his timing was exquisite," Greenspan later said. "It was a risky action [which]... I wouldn't recommend as a general rule for central banks." Yam responded with an open letter, stating his disappointment and defending the decision of the HKMA.

In 2007, Yam was the highest paid central banker in the world, with an annual salary of US$1.32 million, about seven times that of the Chairman of the Federal Reserve ($191,300)., and approximately three times that of the President of the European Central Bank (EUR 351,816 in 2008), the Governor of the Bank of England (GBP 290,000 in 2008) and the Governor of the Bank of Japan ($370,000 in 2007)

In 2008, Yam was summoned by a subcommittee of Legislative Council of Hong Kong in a hearing regarding issues arising from Lehman Brothers-related Minibonds and structured financial products

Convergence plan
Noticing the pricing differential between shares listed on both the local market (H-shares) and the Shanghai Stock Exchange (A-shares), Yam pushed for mechanisms to promote greater convergence and arbitrage. 
Ignoring major obstacles pointed out by local brokers, he is credited with persuading the Government to take a 5.9% stake in the Hong Kong Stock Exchange as leverage, and then pushing the program which allowed mainland individuals to buy Hong Kong securities directly by opening foreign-currency accounts at the Bank of China branch in northern Tianjin. 
The scheme was announced by the State Administration of Foreign Exchange on 20 August 2007, but stalled at the starting gate, when Beijing refused to grant permission.

Retirement from public service
On 19 May 2009, Yam confirmed his plan to retire, after having served in his post for 16 years. When it was originally announced in October 2007 that he would retire on 1 October 2009, financial columnist Jake van der Kamp linked Yam's departure with his handling of the A-share and H-share plans which destabilised Hong Kong's economy.

Chief Executive Sir Donald Tsang of Hong Kong described Yam as a "comrade in arm [sic] who acted in concert with the government in 1998 to overcome the Asian financial turmoil and under the present financial tsunami, Hong Kong's banking system has remained stable."

UBS Group AG
In April 2011, Yam was elected to the board of directors of UBS AG and since 2011 he has been a member of both the Corporate Culture and Responsibility Committee and the Risk Committee. From November 2014 till May 2017, he was a member of the board of directors of UBS Group AG.

Views and opinions 
In July 2022, Yam said that the Hong Kong dollar peg to the US Dollar should remain, and that if the US waged a "financial war" against China, it would be unlikely to affect Hong Kong.

Other positions held

After retiring from his role as the chief executive of the Hong Kong Monetary Authority in September 2009, Joseph Yam took up a number of appointments. Upon his retirement, he was appointed as the Executive Vice-President of the China Society for Finance and Banking, a society managed by the People's Bank of China. He thus also became de facto an advisor to the People's Bank of China.

In 2010, Yam was also appointed as an independent non-executive director to the board of Johnson Electric Holdings Limited and to the board of China Construction Bank. He was initially appointed for a two-year term till 2012 to the board of Johnson Electric Holdings Limited. This mandate was later extended and Yam currently still serves on the board. He left his post as an independent non-executive director of the China Construction Bank on 23 October 2013.

He served the Hong Kong Mortgage Corporation Limited in the position of a deputy chairman and director and as a member of the advisory council at Central Bank of United Arab Emirates.

Joseph Yam is also a member of the International Council of China Investment Corporation, and a member of the boards of UnionPay International Co., Ltd. and of the Community Chest of Hong Kong.

He is also a Distinguished Research Fellow at the Institute of Global Economics and Finance at the Chinese University of Hong Kong.

Honours
In 2001, Yam was awarded the honorary degree of Doctor of Business Administration by the Open University of Hong Kong (OUHK). In November 2009, Yam was awarded Doctor of Business Administration honoris causa by the Hong Kong University of Science & Technology. He was also appointed to the Hong Kong Institute of Education (now the Education University of Hong Kong) as an Honorary Professor affiliated to the Department of Asian and Policy Studies for a period of three years, starting from February 2015.

As well as honorary doctorate degrees and honorary professorships from local and overseas universities, Yam was also recognised for his public service career and contribution to Hong Kong. In 1995, he was appointed Commander of the Most Excellent Order of the British Empire (CBE). In 2009, the Hong Kong Special Administrative Region Government awarded him the Grand Bauhinia Medal (GBM), the highest national award, and in 2001 the Gold Bauhinia Star (GBS). Moreover, in 1997, Euromoney named him Central Banker of the Year.

External links 

 Curriculum vitae on UBS website
Personal Blog
 List of graduates of University of Hong Kong

Further reading 
"Joseph Yam and big currencies" Economist, June 15, 2012
"Political tensions could undermine Hong Kong as China's top financial centre: Joseph Yam" SCMP, June 23, 2014
"Occupy threatens city's growth, warn Norman Chan and Joseph Yam" SCMP, 30 October 2014
"Former HKMA chief Joseph Yam says China quite right to take a cautious approach on allowing the yuan to become freely traded" SCMP, May 26, 2017
Viewpoints on financial culture: Financial infrastructure Ejinsight, July 10, 2017

References

|width=25% align=center|Deputy Secretary for Monetary Affairs1985–1991
|width=25% align=center|Succeeded by:TBD
|-
|width=25% align=center|Preceded by: new office
|width=25% align=center|Director of the Office of the Exchange Fund 1991–1993
|width=25% align=center|Succeeded by:office abolished
|-

1947 births
Living people
Government officials of Hong Kong
Members of the Executive Council of Hong Kong
Alumni of St. Paul's College, Hong Kong
Alumni of the University of Hong Kong
Central bankers
Hong Kong chief executives
Hong Kong financial businesspeople
Commanders of the Order of the British Empire
Recipients of the Grand Bauhinia Medal
Recipients of the Gold Bauhinia Star
Hong Kong justices of the peace
China Construction Bank people